Mazarrón Fútbol Club is a Spanish football club based in the municipality of Mazarrón in the autonomous community of Region de Murcia. Founded in 2010 after its predecessor Mazarrón CF was dissolved, they currently play in Tercera División – Group 13, the fourth tier of Spanish football. They play their home games at Estadio Municipal Pedro Méndez Méndez, which has a capacity of around 3,000 people

History
Mazarrón FC was founded on 2 August 2010 as a replacement to dissolved Mazarrón CF, with former player José Miguel Rodríguez becoming the team's president. Initially taking the place of CFS El Progreso, the club spent their first two seasons in the Regional Preferente, the first tier of regional football (fifth tier), before suffering relegation to Primera Regional.

After two seasons in the sixth tier, Mazarrón returned to Preferente in 2016, promoting to Tercera División in 2018. In 2020, they reached the promotion play-offs after finishing fifth (the fourth, Real Murcia Imperial, was unavailable for promotion); it was subsequently knocked out by CF Lorca Deportiva, however.

Season to season

2 seasons in Tercera División

Stadium
Mazarrón play their home games at the Estadio Municipal Pedro Méndez Méndez, which has a capacity of around 3,000 people. The stadium was named Municipal de Mazarrón until 2018, when it was changed to the current name.

References

External links
 
Soccerway team profile

Football clubs in the Region of Murcia
Sports teams in the Region of Murcia
Association football clubs established in 2010
2010 establishments in Spain